Neobisium noricum is a species of pseudoscorpions in the Neobisiidae family. It has only been found in Austria, and once in Hungary. The type locality is Hohentauern (published as Hohe Tauern) in Styria (as Steiermark), Austria.

References
 Novák, J. 2017. Neobisium (N.) tothi sp. nov., a new species from Hungary and Romania, and first records of Neobisium (N.) noricum Beier, 1939 from Hungary (Pseudoscorpiones: Neobisiidae). Turkish Journal of Zoology 41(3): 416–423. PDF.

Neobisiidae
Animals described in 1939
Arachnids of Europe